Deagon Ward is a Brisbane City Council ward covering Deagon, Boondall, Brighton, Sandgate, Shorncliffe, Taigum and parts of Geebung, Virginia and Zillmere.

Councillors for Deagon Ward

Results

2020

2016

2012

References

City of Brisbane wards